Badgworth is a village and civil parish in the Sedgemoor district of Somerset, England,  south west of Axbridge.  According to the 2011 census it had a population of 525.

The village is home to an equestrian centre known as the Badgworth Arena.

History

The ancient village was named W. Bagewerre in 1086. The modern parish includes the villages of Biddisham where the Church of St John The Baptist dates from the 13th century but was rebuilt in the 15th century, and Tarnock the name of which is believed to be Brythonic in origin.

Late Iron Age and Romano-British pottery was found at a kiln site in the village in the 1830s. It consisted primarily of jars with bead rims and bowls with flanged or rolled rims.

The parish of Badgeworth was part of the Winterstoke Hundred, while Biddisham was part of the Bempstone hundred. A map of Winterstoake Hundred from the year 1645 shows the village name as Baddesworh; on the map, the hundred contains the parish although a later hand added a bold hundred boundary line that incorrectly separated the parish from its hundred.

Badgworth Court is a Grade II-listed Georgian manor house.

Governance

The parish council has responsibility for local issues, including setting an annual precept (local rate) to cover the council's operating costs and producing annual accounts for public scrutiny. The parish council evaluates local planning applications and works with the local police, district council officers, and neighbourhood watch groups on matters of crime, security, and traffic. The parish council's role also includes initiating projects for the maintenance and repair of parish facilities, as well as consulting with the district council on the maintenance, repair, and improvement of highways, drainage, footpaths, public transport, and street cleaning. Conservation matters (including trees and listed buildings) and environmental issues are also the responsibility of the council.

The village falls within the Non-metropolitan district of Sedgemoor, which was formed on 1 April 1974 under the Local Government Act 1972, having previously been part of Axbridge Rural District, which is responsible for local planning and building control, local roads, council housing, environmental health, markets and fairs, refuse collection and recycling, cemeteries and crematoria, leisure services, parks, and tourism.

Somerset County Council is responsible for running the largest and most expensive local services such as education, social services, libraries, main roads, public transport, policing and fire services, trading standards, waste disposal and strategic planning.

It is also part of the Wells county constituency represented in the House of Commons of the Parliament of the United Kingdom. It elects one Member of Parliament (MP) by the first past the post system of election, and was part of the South West England constituency of the European Parliament prior to Britain leaving the European Union in January 2020, which elected seven MEPs using the d'Hondt method of party-list proportional representation.

Religious sites

In Badgworth the Church of St Congar, which takes its name from Congar of Congresbury, dates from the 14th century with further work in the 16th century including the west tower, which contains a bell dating from 1791 and made by Thomas and James Bilbie of the Bilbie family. It has been designated by English Heritage as a Grade II listed building. The church is on the Heritage at Risk Register due to damage to the walls and tower.

References

External links

 

Villages in Sedgemoor
Civil parishes in Somerset